Hanson Cement is a cement production company located in the United Kingdom. It was called Castle Cement until it was rebranded in 2009. The company is now owned by HeidelbergCement. Hanson Cement has a long history dating back to the early 19th century, when it was founded as the Portland Cement Company.

History
The company was formed in 1981 through an amalgamation of three firms:
 Tunnel Portland Cement Company Ltd (founded 1874) with plants at West Thurrock, Essex (1874), Pitstone, Buckinghamshire (1937) and Padeswood, Flintshire (1949).
 Ketton Portland Cement Company Ltd (founded 1929) with a plant at Ketton, Rutland.
 Ribblesdale Cement Ltd (founded 1937) with a plant at Clitheroe, Lancashire.

The company was acquired by HeidelbergCement in May 2007.

In 2005, the company's depot in Birmingham was sold and subsequently redeveloped as Curzon Gate.

Environmental concerns
The company admitted to numerous environmental offences over the years leading up to 2009, during a case in which it was fined 250,000 pounds by the Environment Agency Wales (EAW) in February 2010.

Operations
The head office is in Castle Hill at Maidenhead in Berkshire, and the works are located in Ketton in Rutland, Buckley in Flintshire, Clitheroe and Avonmouth near Bristol. The company has a marine terminal at Avonmouth that is used for the importation of cement in bulk, with samples from there tested at the Ketton site's laboratory each week to ensure they meet British Standards. Cement is also imported through the Humber ports.

Hanson Cement holds an open day at the Ketton production facility every year in July.

References

External links
Official website

Building materials companies of the United Kingdom
Cement companies of the United Kingdom
Companies based in Maidenhead
Manufacturing companies established in 1929
1929 establishments in England